Haniel is a moshav in central Israel. Located in the Sharon plain near Netanya and Kfar Yona, it falls under the jurisdiction of Hefer Valley Regional Council.

History
The moshav was founded in 1950 by immigrants from Romania. It was established on land that had previously belonged to the depopulated Palestinian village of Qaqun. It was named after Haniel Ben Afud, a leader of the Tribe of Manasseh (Numbers 34:23).

References 

Moshavim
Populated places established in 1950
Populated places in Central District (Israel)
Romanian-Jewish culture in Israel
1950 establishments in Israel